Enter k is the eleventh studio album by Peter Hammill, originally released on the Naive Records label in October 1982.  The label was owned and operated by Gordian Troeller, the former manager of Hammill's band Van der Graaf Generator that had found success managing Orchestral Manoeuvres in the Dark (which Hammill has said "must have been a blessed relief after the VdGG years"). Hammill subsequently reissued the album on his own Fie! label.

The album was Hammill's first studio album to be recorded with the K Group, a band that he had formed in 1981 to tour material from his earlier albums A Black Box and Sitting Targets.  Each member of the band adopted an alias: Hammill was K, John Ellis was Fury, Nic Potter was Mozart and Guy Evans was Brain. The K Group also backed Hammill during his performance on a 1981 broadcast of Rockpalast, as well as Hammill's first live album, The Margin.

Enter k reached #21 in the UK Indie Chart.

"Don't Tell Me" was re-worked for Hammill's 1984 album The Love Songs.

Track listing
All songs written by Peter Hammill.

"Paradox Drive"
"The Unconscious Life"
"Accidents"
"The Great Experiment"
"Don't Tell Me"
"She Wraps It Up"
"Happy Hour"

The Fie! reissue contained an extra track:

"Seven Wonders"

Personnel 
k Group
Peter Hammill (k) – vocals, guitar, keyboards
John Ellis (Fury) - lead guitar
Nic Potter (Mozart) - bass
Guy Evans (Brain) - drums
with:
David Jackson - saxophone on "The Unconscious Life" and "Don't Tell Me"

Technical 
Peter Hammill - recording engineer (Sofa Sound, Wiltshire)
David Lord - recording engineer, mixing (Crescent Studios, Bath)
Steve Byrne, Valerie Hawthorn - artwork
Jo Swan - photography

References

External links 
Peter Hammill's notes on the album

Peter Hammill albums
1982 albums